Inyo may refer to:

Places

California 
 Inyo County, California
 Inyo National Forest, USA
 The Inyo Mountains
 The Mono–Inyo Craters

Other uses 
 Japanese for yin and yang
 A bee fly genus Inyo
 Virginia and Truckee 22 Inyo, a steam locomotive from the Virginia and Truckee Railroad